The Curtain Hits the Cast is the third studio album by American indie rock band Low. It was released in 1996 on Vernon Yard Recordings.

Release
The Curtain Hits the Cast was released on Vernon Yard Recordings in 1996. The album's cover photograph shows almost the entirety of member Mimi Parker's minimalist drum kit. "Lust" was released as part of a four-way split 7-inch (on clear green vinyl) entitled Indie Rock Flea Market, at around the same time.

Following the release of the album, the band's major-label-funded tenure ended and they moved to Kranky. LP-only tracks "Prisoner" and "Tomorrow One" later appeared on the 2004 rarities box set A Lifetime of Temporary Relief: 10 Years of B-Sides and Rarities.

Track listing

Personnel
Low
Alan Sparhawk – guitars, vocals, keyboards
Mimi Parker – percussion, vocals
Zak Sally – bass guitar, keyboards

Additional personnel
Steve Fisk – keyboards

References

Low (band) albums
1996 albums
Albums produced by Steve Fisk